The Palazzo Corsini is a prominent late-baroque palace in Rome, erected for the Corsini family between 1730 and 1740 as an elaboration of the prior building on the site, a 15th-century villa of the Riario family, based on designs of Ferdinando Fuga. It is located in the Trastevere section of the city, and stands beside the Villa Farnesina.

Description
During 1659–1689, the former Riario palace had hosted the eccentric Christina, Queen of Sweden, who abdicated, converted, and moved to Rome. Under her patronage, this was the site for the first meetings of the Roman Accademia dell'Arcadia.

In 1736, the Florentine Cardinal Neri Maria Corsini, nephew of Pope Clement XII (formerly Cardinal Lorenzo Corsini), acquired the villa and land, and commissioned the structure now standing. During the Napoleonic occupation of Rome, the palace hosted Joseph Bonaparte.

Today, the palace hosts some offices of the National Academy of Science (Accademia dei Lincei) and the Galleria Corsini. The gardens, which rise up the Janiculum hill, are part of the Orto Botanico dell'Università di Roma "La Sapienza", a botanical garden. This also, is not the sole Palazzo Corsini in Italy; there are a handful of palaces belonging to various lines of this Florentine family, which acquired and built this Roman palace, sometime referred to as Palazzo Corsini alla Lungara only upon the ascension of their family member to the papacy. Another Corsini palace of note include the Palazzo Corsini al Parione, facing the banks of the Arno in Florence.

Galleria Corsini

The Galleria Nazionale d'Arte Antica di Palazzo Corsini or National Gallery of Antique Art in the Corsini Palace is a prominent art museum comprising the first floor of the palace. The national Arte Antica collections (typically post-year 1000 A.D.) in Rome consist of a number of sites, including Palazzo Barberini, Galleria Borghese, and the Palazzo Corsini.

The majority of the major works in the Corsini Gallery collection were donated by the Corsini family, and initially were gathered by the avid 17th century collector, the cardinal Neri Maria Corsini, and added to by other members and from collections of Pope Clement XII and his nephew. In 1883, this palace and its contents were sold to the state, and the collection is displayed in its original location. The collection encompasses the breadth of mainly Italian art from early-Renaissance to late-18th century. It has both religious and historical works, as well as landscapes and genre paintings.

Partial list of collection

Sources

 Palazzo Corsini 
  Accademia Nazionale dei Lincei, hosted in the Palazzo Corsini and neighboring Villa Farnesina.
  Romecity entry

External links
 Official webpage of Palazzo Corsini
 Interactive Nolli Map Website

Art museums and galleries in Rome
Palaces in Rome
National museums of Italy
Houses completed in 1740
Galleria Nazionale d'Arte Antica
Rome R. XIII Trastevere
1740 establishments in the Papal States